Under the English common law rule known as the 'forfeiture rule', a person who has unlawfully killed another is barred from acquiring any benefit as a consequence of the killing, and all inheritance and other rights are normally forfeit. The Forfeiture Act 1982 (c. 34) is an Act of Parliament of the United Kingdom which allows the court to relax or to set aside operation of the rigid common law rule where "the justice of the case" so requires (other than to benefit a murderer).

Contents
Under section 1(1) the 'forfeiture rule' is defined as "the rule of public policy which in certain circumstances precludes a person who has unlawfully killed another from acquiring a benefit in consequence of the killing". Section 2 provides:

Section 5 prevents the court from relaxing or setting aside the normal forfeiture rule to benefit a person who has been convicted of murder.

See also

 Estates of Deceased Persons (Forfeiture Rule and Law of Succession) Act 2011
 Slayer rule - similar rule in United States law

Notes

United Kingdom Acts of Parliament 1982
Property law of the United Kingdom